Islam Expo is an Islamic exhibition held in London in July 2006 and July 2008. In 2006 it was held at the Alexandra Palace in London, a city with a large Muslim population and it was described as being the largest Islamic exhibition ever held in Europe.

There were stalls by Islamic businesses and charities like Muslim Hands and Islamic Relief. There was also stalls selling Islamic music, clothing, food and books. There was also opportunities to get free henna tattoos and your name written in Arabic. There was also an interactive section on the Five Pillars of Islam, an exhibition of young British Islamic art, and a section on famous Islamic scientists and mathematicians. There was also a fun fair in the grounds and lectures by various people from within and outside the Islamic population like Mayor of London Ken Livingstone, singer Yusuf Islam, formerly known as Cat Stevens and Muslim BBC news reporter Asad Ahmad. There was screenings of Islamic films, and Islamic musicians.

Aims
The aims of the exposition was to:
 Introduce the British public to Islam as a global culture and faith that spans continents, races and languages.
 Shed light over the Islamic empires’ great achievements in the various fields of knowledge; from science to technology and from art to literature. Many of these were by converts (reluctant or otherwise) to Islam during its period of empire.
 Create stronger foundations for Muslims to understand their heritage and develop their identity.
 Purportedly combat the myths, misconceptions and misunderstanding of Islam.
 Encourage positive interaction between Muslims and the different races and cultures of British society. Working towards a more open, tolerant and pluralistic Britain.
 Promote multiculturalism.

Guest speakers

A number of guest speakers made lectures at the 2006 expo including:
 Asad Ahmad, BBC 
 Norman Kember, former hostage in Iraq
 Yusuf Islam, former pop star Cat Stevens
 Sadiq Khan, British MP
 Muhammad Abdul Bari, Secretary General of the Muslim Council of Britain
 Rageh Omaar, journalist of Al Jazeera, author
 Wadah Khanfar, Director General of Al Jazeera Network
 Yasmin Alibhai Brown, Ugandan-born British journalist and author 
 Ken Livingstone, Mayor of London 2000-2008
 Tariq Ramadan, Teacher of Islamic Theology at Oxford University
 Seumas Milne, British Journalist, writer
 Peter Oborne, British journalist, author, commentator

References

External links
 The Official site
 IslamExpo - 11-14 July 2008
 Alexandra Palace entry

Islam in London
2006 conferences
2008 conferences
2006 in London
2008 in London